Thin Wires In The Voice is a 120-page booklet written by Italian writer Luca Ferrari with a 3 track EP by Tim Buckley. The EP is a compilation of "Song to the Siren", featuring just Buckley's guitar and voice, recorded for the TV show The Monkees and two live recordings taken from a 1968 Danish radio broadcast. This earlier version of Starsailor track "Song to the Siren" is more folk-oriented and can also be found on Morning Glory: The Tim Buckley Anthology. The two live recordings are also found on Buckley's 1968 live album Copenhagen Tapes. The booklet is dual language appraisal of Tim Buckley in Italian and English. It also contains selected lyrics and poetry.

Track listing

"Song to the Siren" (Larry Beckett, Tim Buckley) – 3:15
"Gypsy Woman" (Buckley) – 12:37
"Buzzin' Fly" (Buckley) – 6:28

Personnel
Tracks 1-3
Tim Buckley – guitar, vocals, 12-string guitar on "Song to the Siren"
Tracks 2-3
Lee Underwood – guitar
Niels-Henning Ørsted Pedersen – double bass
David Friedman – vibraphone

References

1999 EPs
Live EPs
Tim Buckley live albums
1999 live albums